Markin Family Student Recreation Center is a multi-purpose student recreational facility constructed in 2008 at Bradley University in Peoria, Illinois.

After the demolition of Robertson Memorial Field House, the Markin Center's intramural championship gym served as the temporary home for the Bradley University women's volleyball program while construction continued on Renaissance Coliseum, a 4,200 seat on-campus arena that will serves as home to both women's basketball and volleyball.

References

External links
Stadium information
Article on arena

Basketball venues in Illinois
College basketball venues in the United States
Indoor arenas in Illinois
Bradley University
Sports venues in Peoria, Illinois
University and college student recreation centers in the United States
Volleyball venues in Illinois
Sports venues completed in 2008
2008 establishments in Illinois